Port Glasgow Junior Football Club is a  Scottish football club, based in the town of Port Glasgow, Inverclyde.

Nicknamed the Undertakers, they were formed as Port Glasgow Athletic Juveniles F.C. in 1948 as an offshoot of Clune Rock Juveniles. They stepped up to the Junior ranks a year later and obtained a place in the Central Junior Football League. They are not related to the pre-War Port Glasgow Athletic Juniors who disbanded in July 1939 after losing their ground.

Their first ground was Woodhall Park, Port Glasgow where they played until being evicted by the local council in 2000 to make way for an industrial development, which was not built until 2014. They then groundshared with local rivals Greenock Juniors at both Ravenscraig Stadium and Battery Park, while Ravenscraig was redeveloped for the 2014 Commonwealth Games. The club returned to Port Glasgow in 2012 at a new £4.4 million community stadium at Parklea.

The team is managed by Stevie Wilson, assisted by David Wilson.

An unrelated senior club, also called Port Glasgow F.C. (1876–1879), participated in the early Scottish Cup seasons.

Staff
Manager: Stevie Wilson, 
Assistant: David Wilson,
Coach: Alan Muir
Coach: Abou Mansare

Honours 
Central League A Division winners: 1978–79
Central League C Division winners: 1975–76
Central Division Two winners: 1999–2000
Glasgow Dryburgh Cup: 1957–58
Evening Times Cup Winners Cup: 1999–2000
Central League First Division winners : 2007–2008
Pompey Cup Winners 1967–68
Erskine hospital Cup winners: 1971, 1981, 1988
Kirkwood  Shield winners 1967–68.

References

External links
 Website
 Facebook
 Twitter
 Scottish Cup Directory

Football clubs in Scotland
Scottish Junior Football Association clubs
Football in Inverclyde
Association football clubs established in 1948
1948 establishments in Scotland
Port Glasgow
West of Scotland Football League teams